Roderick Howard Allen (16 May 1929 – 22 August 2007) was a British advertising executive who wrote many well known advertising slogans and jingles used in the United Kingdom. He was nicknamed the "jingle king".

Allen was born in Consett, County Durham and worked in advertising from the age of 17. His career was only interrupted by National Service in the Royal Corps of Signals. In 1966, Allen joined Mike Brady and Peter Marsh to co-found the advertising agency Allen, Brady and Marsh, which was one of the five largest agencies in the UK during the early 1980s until its demise in the late 80s following a take-over by another ad agency, Lowe.

Famous slogans 
I'm a secret lemonade drinker – R. White's Lemonade
the listening bank –  Midland Bank
the wonder of Woolies –  Woolworths
Harp stays sharp –  Harp Lager
Milk's gotta lotta bottle –  National Dairy Council
This is the age of the train –  British Railways
Triangular honey from triangular bees –  Toblerone
power to the people –  Ever Ready batteries.
This is luxury you can afford, by Cyril Lord –  Cyril Lord carpets.
 Fit the best. Everest.  – Everest Double Glazing
 Stella's for the fellas who take their lager strong –  Stella Artois
 The pint that thinks it's a quart  –  Whitbread Trophy Bitter

External links
Obituary: The Independent
Obituary: The Liverpool Daily Post
Guardian article

People from Consett
British advertising executives
1929 births
2007 deaths
20th-century British Army personnel
Royal Corps of Signals soldiers
20th-century English businesspeople